Nairn is a surname. Notable people with the surname include:

 Allan Nairn (b. 1956), American investigative journalist
 Gary Nairn (b. 1951), former Australian politician
 Ian Nairn (1930–1983), British architectural critic
 James Nairn (1859–1904), Scottish painter
 Kristian Nairn (b. 1975), an actor and disc jockey
 Nick Nairn (b. 1959), Scottish celebrity chef
 Rob Nairn, South African Buddhist teacher and author
 Thomas McIntyre Nairn (1830–1888), Ontario businessman and political figure
 Tom Nairn (1932–2023), Scottish theorist of nationalism
 Walter Nairn (1878–1958), Australian politician
 Norman Nairn (1894–1968) and his brother Gerald (1897–1980); see Nairn Transport Company

See also
 Nairn (fictional character), fictional character from the Sharpe series of novels
 Nairn, Scotland
 Nairn Baronets
 Spencer-Nairn

Scottish surnames